The Kimberly High School in Kimberly, Wisconsin, is a public high school that enrolls around 1,600 students. It is the only high school in the Kimberly Area School District. The school has 102 certified teaching staff and four guidance counselors.

Academics

AP courses 
Kimberly High School offers 20 Advanced Placement (AP) courses.

Athletics 

The Papermakers are a Division 1 school competing in the Fox Valley Association with other Fox Valley schools, as well as schools from the Wausau area. A historic rivalry exists between the Papermakers and the neighboring Kaukauna Ghosts.

State championships 

Kimberly High School has earned 35 Wisconsin Interscholastic Athletic Association state championship titles, the 14th most in the state across all divisions.

*Hockey and Boys Volleyball only have one division.

**For the 2020–2021 school year, the WIAA created the Alternate Fall season due to the COVID-19 pandemic, allowing schools to opt to field all/some fall sports to the Alternate Fall season, occurring between the typical winter and spring seasons. Kimberly opted to play boys volleyball in the Alternate Fall rather the typical fall season, and won the state championship.

Football 
Kimberly High School's football team has back-to-back WIAA Division 2 state titles (2007–2008), another WIAA Division 2 state title in 2013, and back-to-back-to-back-to-back WIAA Division 1 state titles (2014-2017). On November 16, 2018, Kimberly High School competed in the WIAA division 1 state football tournament and lost 21–24 against Muskego High School ending their 5-year streak winning the state title. With 5 consecutive state titles and a 70-game winning streak, Kimberly held the longest active streak in high school football nationally  until August 17, 2018 when the streak was snapped in a 31–28 home loss to the Fond du Lac Cardinals. In 2017, Camp Randall started a "Camp Randall 100" campaign, celebrating 100 years of the stadium. They selected 100 influential people in the stadium's history. Blair Mulholland, Kimberly running back, was named to the list, for his 464-yard, 4 touchdown game in the 2015 Wisconsin State Division 1 Football Championship.

The school's mascot is the paper wasp. The "Papermaker" wasp logo was created by Jim Nirschl, a longtime Kimberly High School art teacher, coach, and athletic director. It was voted by the student body to be named "Cornman12", but was overruled by administration thus settling on "Mack the Mighty Maker" as the mascot's official title.

Boys track and field 
Kimberly High School's Boys Track and Field team has back-to-back-to-back WIAA Division 1 state titles (2017-2019).

Girls hockey 
Kimberly High School doesn't have a girls (or boys) hockey team, but instead teams up with 15 other schools (Xavier, Appleton East/North/West, Fox Valley Lutheran, Freedom, Hortonville, Kaukauna, Little Chute, Menasha, Neenah, New London, St/ Mary Catholic, Two Rivers and Wrightstown) to form one girls' team, "Xavier Co-op".

At the 2019 WIAA state championship at the Alliant Energy Center, #1 Xavier Co-op played #4 Sun Prairie Co-op in the semifinals, with Xavier winning 3–1. In the championship game, Xavier Co-op played #3 Hudson High School (Wisconsin). The game went into double OT, with Xavier Co-op winning 6–5.

Softball 
At the 2014 WIAA state championship held at the Goodman Softball Complex, Kimberly Softball defeated Westosha Central 6–5. Left fielder Carleigh Johnson hit a home run to left center, giving Kimberly the win. A notable game as it went to 15 innings, with games only going to 7. Kimberly had 27 wins and only 3 losses that season.

Following the 2014 state championship win, the Kimberly softball team had won their way to the state tournament again. However, losing in the quarterfinals, 16–2, against Watertown High School (Wisconsin).

Controversies 
Kimberly High School has been in the local media news regarding situations of racism in the student body. The first reported incident occurred in January 2018, when a white student wrote the n-word on the desk of an African American peer. The student was given a 5-day suspension, and counseling offered to the victim. The superintendent at the time, Robert Mayfield, released a statement to Action 2 News saying, "The actions of one individual do not represent the values of 5,000 students." The victim came forward publicly after the story broke, Isabella Brown, saying "Be kind you know, be respectful to others."

The second reported incident occurred in February 2021, when an Instagram account was created with the Kimberly logo promoting a "White Club". The school administrators deny any sort of involvement with this account, "Let me be clear. We do not and would not have a club like this here at Kimberly High School. We stand against racism, and this type of behavior will simply not be tolerated", said Principal DePeau.

Another incident that did not receive local media attention was the creation of a petition on Change.org urging the district to implement changes to be more "Inclusive for BIPOC Students", in the summer of 2020. The petition lists changes that the district should implement, and attention for the petition rose after the "White Club" incident of 2021. The petition has more than 2,500 signatures, and the district did not make any changes after the petition.

Notable alumni

Sports 
Mike Verstegen (Class of 1990) former professional football player in the NFL
A. J. Klein (Class of 2009) professional football player in the NFL
Paul Schommer (Class of 2010) 2022 Winter Olympic Games athlete in the biathlon
Logan Bruss - (Class of 2017) professional football player in the NFL

Local/state/national rankings

References

External links
 Kimberly High School website

Public high schools in Wisconsin
Schools in Outagamie County, Wisconsin
Educational institutions with year of establishment missing